"Changes" is a song by British singer Will Young. It was written by Young and producer Eg White for his fourth studio album, Let It Go (2008). The song was released as the album's lead single on 19 September 2008, as a digital download, with the physical release a week later.

Chart performance
"Changes" was premiered on 28 July 2008 on BBC Radio 2 by presenter Ken Bruce. For the week commencing 16 August 2008, it was added into rotation on BBC Radio 2. The song was immediately placed on the A-list, denoting heavy rotation. "Changes" also debuted on the first Today's 4Music Top 10 chart at number one on 18 August 2008. On 21 September 2008, it entered the UK Singles Chart at number 10. The week of 28 September 2008, the song fell to number 13, becoming his lowest-charting lead single from an album.

Music video
A music video for "Changes," directed by Martin de Thurah, was shot on the 1 August 2008 on location near Tonbridge. According to his website, Young says "It has probably been the hardest video I’ve ever had to shoot. I ran up and down country lanes, was struck by lightning, set on fire and partially drowned. It’s amazing what you’ll do for music!"
He continues, saying he had to drink foul smelling soup, dance in a hay-filled barn in front of a windmachine and also had to lay on rocks, soaked in freezing cold water. It premièred on Channel V on 16 August 2008.

In the beginning, Young seems to be in a deserted petrol station, filling up a petrol canister. He then looks around to find some more people sitting in their cars or sitting outside of it. Also in a shot, a cow is walking along the petrol station. The next shot features Young being in and around his house. He is having a drink, listening to music, and also sitting on the bed, looking out of the window. The next shot upstairs in his house shows him standing what appears to be naked in front of mirrors, singing along with the song. He then gets dressed again and slowly things in the room start to catch fire, including him.

In the next scene Young is throwing things into a big fire. He actually burns his motorbike and personal belongings like a book or photos. After that scene,  Will is shown dancing and jumping around in a barn, with hay flying all across the room. The music suddenly stops for a second and a voice appears, asking him what he is doing in that barn. He then gets kicked out and the next shot features Will running along a lonely dark street. He looks at the sky which is filling with clouds. Little sparks suddenly appear on Young's shoulders and as he runs along the street he gets struck by a lightning.

He lays motionless on the street for some seconds. It also starts to rain very heavily. The last shot shows him opening his eyes and lifting his head.

Track listings

Notes
 signifies additional producer(s)

Credits and personnel
Richard Edgeler – mixing assistance
The London Studio Orchestra – strings
Jeremy Wheatley – mixing engineer
Eg White – writer
Will Young – vocals, writer

Charts

Release history

References

2008 singles
Will Young songs
Songs written by Eg White
2008 songs
Songs written by Will Young